Bethel Airport  is a state-owned public-use airport located three nautical miles (6 km) southwest of the central business district of Bethel, a city in the Bethel Census Area of the U.S. state of Alaska.

As per Federal Aviation Administration records, the airport had 140,291 passenger boardings (enplanements) in calendar year 2008, 134,848 enplanements in 2009, and 144,353 in 2010. It is included in the National Plan of Integrated Airport Systems for 2011–2015, which categorized it as a primary commercial service airport (more than 10,000 enplanements per year).

History
Construction began September 21, 1941, and the airfield was activated July 4, 1942; it was known as Bethel Air Base. It was used by Air Transport Command as auxiliary airfield for Lend-Lease aircraft being flown to Siberia. The facility was transferred to Eleventh Air Force, then to Alaskan Air Command in 1945; it became the joint-use Bethel Airport. It was used for construction of AC&W Bethel Air Force Station in the mid-1950s. Full jurisdiction was turned over to Alaska Government in 1958.

Facilities and aircraft

For the 12-month period ending March 31, 2018, the airport had 122,000 aircraft operations, an average of 334 per day: 54% air taxi, 41% general aviation, 4% scheduled commercial, and 1% military. At that time there were 112 aircraft based at this airport: 86% single-engine, 6% multi-engine, 6% helicopter, and 2% military.

Airlines and destinations

The following airlines offer scheduled passenger service:

Prior to its bankruptcy and cessation of all operations, Ravn Alaska served the airport from multiple locations.

Statistics

Statistics

Cargo airlines

References

External links
 Topographic map from USGS The National Map
 
 

Airports in the Bethel Census Area, Alaska
WAAS reference stations